Ruben Örtegren (19 October 1881 – 27 February 1965) was a Swedish sport shooter who competed in the 1912 Summer Olympics.

In 1912 he won the silver medal as member of the Swedish team in the team 50 metre small-bore rifle competition. In the 50 metre rifle, prone event he finished 19th and in the 600 metre free rifle competition he finished 49th.

References

External links
profile

1881 births
1965 deaths
Swedish male sport shooters
ISSF rifle shooters
Olympic shooters of Sweden
Shooters at the 1912 Summer Olympics
Olympic silver medalists for Sweden
Olympic medalists in shooting
Medalists at the 1912 Summer Olympics
Sport shooters from Stockholm